Two ships of the Royal Netherlands Navy have been named HNLMS Jan van Brakel, after the 17th century naval commander Jan van Brakel:

 , a minelayer launched in 1936 and expended as a target in 1957
 , a  launched in 1981. She was sold to Greece in 2002 and renamed Kanaris

Royal Netherlands Navy ship names